Martinique Passage (also called Dominica Channel) is a strait in the Caribbean that separates Dominica and Martinique.

See also 
 Dominica–France Maritime Delimitation Agreement
Saint Lucia Channel

References

Straits of the Caribbean
Bodies of water of Dominica
Bodies of water of Martinique
Dominica–Martinique border
International straits